Somasuntheram Thambirajah was a Sri Lankan Tamil politician and Member of Parliament.

Thambirajah was born on 10 November 1917.

Thambirajah stood as the United National Party's candidate in Paddiruppu at the 1970 parliamentary election. He won and entered Parliament. He contested the 1977 parliamentary election as the Sri Lanka Freedom Party but failed to get re-elected after coming third.

References

1917 births
Members of the 7th Parliament of Ceylon
People from Eastern Province, Sri Lanka
People from British Ceylon
Sri Lanka Freedom Party politicians
Sri Lankan Tamil politicians
United National Party politicians
Year of death missing